Ticktock (1996) is a novel by Dean Koontz.  It is significantly out-of-genre for Koontz: after a typical horror opening, the tone of the plot changes to screwball comedy and the humour increases steadily to the end. The subplot of protagonist Tommy Phan's struggle to reconcile his family's tenacious hold on their Vietnamese roots with his personal desire to be purely American is essential to the plot development.

Plot summary
Tommy Phan is a first-generation Vietnamese American in southern California, a successful detective novelist whose greatest ambition is to live the American Dream. The story opens with Tommy getting a new Corvette. He argues with his mother, refusing her offer for dinner. In a fit of rebellion, he eats two cheeseburgers, something his mother dislikes. He meets a blond waitress there (whom he will meet later in the story again). His radio quits working during one of these two trips, and in the static are eerie voices.

Once home, he finds a Rag doll on his front steps, along with a note, written in Vietnamese, which he knew when he was a child but has forgotten in his quest to be a true American. After taking the doll into his study, it soon bursts open to reveal an evil creature who seems intent on killing Tommy. A message is left on his computer screen saying he has until dawn, but what will happen at dawn, Tommy does not know. After fate brings a meeting with Del, a woman who appears to speak somewhat cryptically, they embark on a race to flee the creature. She believes him too quickly, and often has mixed stories for all of her abilities. (At one point she stole a car, saying one minute she hotwired it, and the next that the key was in the ignition.)

The doll appears to be growing larger as their journey continues. They visit Tommy's brother, Gi, to try and translate the note. They then go to Del's apartment, where we learn she's quite rich, but is a waitress anyway. She also shows another side to her when Tommy wants to see her paintings, and she threatens to shoot him if he does. Her dog seems incredibly smart, something that unnerves Tommy.

In their journey to escape the ever-growing doll, Tommy's Corvette is trashed, two cars are stolen, and one large boat is trashed. They arrive at Del's mother's home, which seems utterly odd. They claim to be able to listen to live stuff from the past with their radio. Del's mother shows an uncanny sense of time when she knows exactly when the rain will stop.

Gi calls and tells Tommy to go to their mother, and not to bring the blonde along. Tommy brings Del along anyway, where he then learns the doll was conjured to scare him back home by a friend of his mother.  They begin a ritual that, after a few harrowing minutes, completely dispels the monster.

Tommy sees Del's paintings and they're of him. She had remotely viewed him over the past 2 years because she knows he is her destiny.

He and Del get married in Vegas. Then they go back to their normal town.

Critical comment
Unlike most of Koontz's work, this is a screwball comedy/horror story, in which the comedy gradually outweighs the horror. Serious themes of pagan magic and family conflicts between the ancestral Vietnamese culture and the "American Dream" are counterpoised with the crazy comedy reminiscent of the classic comedy movies of the 1930s such as "Bringing Up Baby".

Critical comment is generally positive. Koontz has stated in the Afterword that he wrote the novel partly as a relief from the darker aspects of his work, especially "Dark Rivers of the Heart", and partly for the challenge of writing a good screwball comedy.

References

External links
 

American thriller novels
1996 American novels
Novels by Dean Koontz
Ballantine Books books